This is a list of city flags in Venezuela.

Amazonas

Anzoátegui

Apure

Aragua

Barinas

Bolívar

Carabobo

Cojedes

Delta Amacuro

Distrito Capital

Falcón

Guárico

Lara

Mérida

Miranda

Monagas

Nueva Esparta

Portuguesa

Sucre

Táchira

Trujillo

Vargas

Yaracuy

Zulia

Venezuela